Matuku may refer to:

 Matuku (bird), monotypic genus of a Miocene heron from New Zealand
 Matuku Island, Fiji
 Matuku (Tonga)
 Matuku-tangotango, monster in Māori mythology
 Māori language name for the Australasian bittern